Sudhanshu Chaturvedi is a writer, translator and academic from Uttar Pradesh, India. He has authored or translated over 120 books in Malayalam, Hindi, Sanskrit and English. Even though his mother tongue is Hindi, he has written most of his books in Malayalam.

He is a former member of the Official Language Committee of the Ministries of Defense, Railways, Urban Development and Poverty Alleviation and is currently the Director of the National Literary Academy.

He has received many awards including Sahitya Akademi Award for translation (1995, for Rassi, translation of Malayalam novel Kayar), Kerala Sahitya Akademi Award for Scientific Literature, Indian Council for Child Education Award for children's literature, Rangeya Raghav Paryatan Puraskar and Uttar Pradesh Hindi Sansthan Souhard Samman.

Nilayilekkozhukiya ganga is the biography of Sudhanshu Chaturvedi written by E. Jayachandran and published by Kerala Bhasha Institute.

Biography
He was born on 15 February 1943 in Madho Nagar, near Kanpur in Kannauj district of Uttar Pradesh.

In 1962, Sudhanshu met Jawaharlal Nehru, the first Prime Minister of India, to demand that Hindi be made the national language of India. He told Nehru that, speakers of other languages should be strictly instructed to learn Hindi by 1965. In response, Nehru rejected his proposal and said that he had to satisfy the entire people of India. Nehru then asked him to study one of the difficult Dravidian language Malayalam. He took up Nehru's challenge and joined the University of Delhi for his master's degree in Malayalam and from there graduated in 1964. He also holds Masters in Sanskrit and Hindi. After completing his MA in 1964, he came Kerala and was appointed Hindi Lecturer at Sri Kerala Varma College, Thrissur. He remained there and retired as department head and college principal. He holds a doctorate in Hindi and Malayalam from the University of Kerala. He is the first D.Lit graduate from the University of Kerala.

Sudhamshu, who spent 43 years in Kerala, has settled in Delhi after his retirement.

Literary contributions

He has authored or translated over 120 books in Malayalam, Hindi, Sanskrit and English. His first translation was a book on Russian Constitution written by Dr. V. R. Sahni, which he translated to Hindi. In 1964 he translated first Malayalam novel to Hindi, which was Odayil Ninnu by P. Kesavadev (Hindi title Nale Se). His book named Sankshiptam Balakandam was a prescribed text for B.A. and B.A. (Hons.) degree. He also published two dictionaries, Hindi-Hindi-Malayalam and Malayalam-Malayalam-Hindi.

Translated from Sanskrit to English
 Kalidasa Sahityasarvaswam - Complete works of Kalidasa
 Bhasa Nataka Sarvaswam -Complete works of Bhasa

Translated from Sanskrit into Malayalam
 Kalidasa Sahityasarvasvam - Complete Works of Kalidasa
 Bhasa Nataka Sarvasvam - Complete Drama Works of Bhasa
 Srimad Valmiki Ramayana (4 volumes) Literal Translation

Translated from Hindi to Malayalam
He has translated many works from Hindi to Malayalam, including Akannupoya chithrangal, Ara divasam and Amruthum vishavum.

Translated from Malayalam to Hindi
He has translated over forty best Malayalam works into Hindi, including Chinthavishtayaya seetha (Kumaranasan), Sandhya, Balyakalasakhi (Vaikom Muhammad Basheer), Odayil Ninnu (P. Kesavadev), Ayalkkar (P. Kesavadev), Himagiri Viharam (Tapovanaswamy), Enippadikal (Thakazhi Sivasankara Pillai), Sundarikalum Sundaranmarum (Uroob), Professor, Kanyaka, Kanchana Sita (C. N. Sreekantan Nair), Indulekha (O. Chandhu Menon), Agnisakshi (Lalithambika Antharjanam), Kayar (Thakazhi Sivasankara Pillai), Tathvamasi (Sukumar Azhikode), Mayyazhippuzhayude Theerangalil (M. Mukundan), Veluthampi dalava (Kainikkara Padmanabha Pillai).

Other works
 Nadi samdrathilekk thanne (His first independent Malayalam novel)
 Theerabhoomi(Malayalam novel)
 Janmaantharam (Malayalam novel)
 Navabharatha shilpikal
 Bharatheeya prathibhakal
 Anthyabhilasham(Malayalam novel)
 Chinnichithariya Mohangal(Malayalam novel)
 Karmadheerante kaalppadukal (Biography of Lal Bahadur Shastri)
 Sumaanjali (Hindi poetry collection)
 Kavithayute Kallukal (Malayalam poetry collection)

Awards
 Sahitya Akademi Translation Prize (for his translation Kayar to Hindi)
 Rangeya Raghav Paryatan Puraskar
 Kerala Sahitya Akademi Award for Scientific Literature
 Dr. Gargi Gupta Anuvad Shree Award for Outstanding Contribution to Translation
 Indian Council for Child Education Award for children's literature
 Uttar Pradesh Hindi Sansthan Souhard Samman
 Vachaspati Award
 Rashtrabhasha Ratna Rashtriya Samman
 Manumitra Award
 Sahitya Ratnam
 Vidyavaridhi Puraskaram

References

External links
Nilayilekkozhukiya Ganga: Review by Padmadas

Writers from Uttar Pradesh
Recipients of the Sahitya Akademi Award in Hindi
Hindi-language writers
Malayalam-language writers
Sanskrit–English translators
Recipients of the Kerala Sahitya Akademi Award
Translators to Malayalam
Recipients of the Sahitya Akademi Prize for Translation